"Growing Up Is _" is a song by Australian singer-songwriter Ruel. The song was released on 10 December 2021 as the lead single from his debut studio album, 4th Wall (2023). The song peaked at number 68 on the ARIA Singles Chart.

The song was described in a press release as being an "ode to the messy, complicated, yet ultimately exhilarating rites of passage we all traverse while growing up." with Ruel saying 
"The idea of the underline at the end of the title was to try to explain that everyone has a different experience growing up. Everyone has ups and downs, but because it's never just one thing, I couldn't just give it one word and wanted to leave it open for interpretation."

At the 2022 ARIA Music Awards, the song earned Ruel a nomination for Best Solo Artist.

Music video
An official live video, directed by Grey Ghost, produced by Jessica Galea and filmed at Filmworx in Melbourne was premiered on 9 December 2021.

Critical reception
Al Newstead from ABC said "The track has the old-school soul of the 19-year-old's golden voice but the production is dreamier, with echoing drums and shimmering guitars providing a melancholy fringe. It all builds to an enrapturing chorus that captures the dizzying experience of youth: falling in and out of love and emotional yo-yo'ing between profound reflection and partying:"

Charts

Certifications

References

2021 singles
2021 songs
Ruel (singer) songs
RCA Records singles
Songs written by M-Phazes
Songs written by Ruel (singer)
Songs written by Julian Bunetta